The Anna Democratic Human Rights Movement Party of India (Anna DHRM) is a political party in India.

References

Political parties in India